J. K. M. A. Aziz (died 2014) was a Bangladesh Awami League politician. He was elected as Member of Parliament for Jessore-3 in 1973.

Career
Aziz was elected to the National Assembly of Pakistan in 1970 from Jhenaidah District (then part of greater Jessore District) as an Awami League candidate. He participated in the Bangladesh Liberation war in 1971. He was elected to Parliament in 1973 from Jessore-3 as a Bangladesh Awami League candidate. He served as the governor of Jhenaidah District in the BAKSAL government. After the Assassination of Sheikh Mujibur Rahman in 1975, he was imprisoned for one year by the new regime.

Death
Aziz died on 16 December 2014 in Jhenaidah, Bangladesh.

References

Awami League politicians
2014 deaths
1st Jatiya Sangsad members
People from Jhenaidah District